Sameer Phaterpekar is an Indian composer who composes music for Hindi films.

Life and early career
Sameer Phaterpekar started his career in the Indian film music Industry as a musician in 1982. During the golden era of live recordings he got an opportunity to workwith legends like R.D.Burman, Kalyanji-Anandji, Rajesh Roshan as well as a guitarist for iconic song composition by Laxmikant-Payrelalfor Hawa Hawaii (Mr. India), Choli Ke Peeche Kya Hai (Khalnayak), Jumma Chumma (Hum) and for Nadeem – Shravan (Ashiqui).
As the face of the music industry started changing in 2002, Sameer ventured out as an independent music composer after setting his foot as a music composer with his first two albums ‘Khoobsurat’ by Venus music company along with Anand Bakshi and the noted gazal singer Talat Aziz and ‘Dil le gaya Ajnabi’ with well-known voice of the music industry Alka Yagnik by Tips music. Sameer went to give background score for nearly 55 Hindi, Marathi, Punjabi and Tamil Films. He has composed songs for remarkable songs like ‘O My Friend Ganesha’ the title track of the popular kid’s movie ‘My Friend Ganesha’ which was a range. 
Mr. Sameer has been associated with all the films’ directed by Mr.Nishikant Kamat. He has composed music for ‘Pal Mai Achanak’ for Nishikant Kamat’s the directorial debut in Hindi cinema ‘Mumbai Meri Jaan’ as well as for ‘Dombivali Fast’ a critically acclaimed National Award film which marked the directorial debut of Nishikant Kama in Marathi cinema. He has also composed background score for John Abraham starrer film ‘Force’ as well as for Marathi debut of Ritesh Deshmukh award-winning movie ‘Lai Bhari’ which was a huge commercial success. The most recent of this association was composing the background score for Ajay Devgan-Tabu starrer Drishyam, which has received both critical appreciation and commercial success also for Irfan Khan, Jimmy Shergill, Tushar Dalvi star cast film ‘Madaari’.
One of the milestones of his musical career was receiving the 'Best Background Music' award at the 5th Dada Saheb Phalke Film Festival 2015. Sameer sees every new project as a new journey and is he is waiting to embark on many such journeys in the future.

Filmography as composers

For Background score only
 Shaadi Karke Phas Gaya Yaar(2002)
 Parwana (2003)
 Kid’s No. (2003)
 Vidyaarthi (2006)
 Hawas (2004)
 MitterPyare Nu (Punjabi) (2004)
 Ali Baba Chalis Chor  (2004)
 Shabanum Mausi (2005)
 Girlfriend (2004)
 Bachelor
 Tauba Tauba (2004)
 Insan (2005)
 Chetna (2005)
 Kal na Kal ye toh Hona Hi Tha  (2004)
 Jalwa (1987)
 Devaki (film) (2006)
 Eight (2006 film)|Eight (2006)
 Meri Life Me Usaki Wife (2009)
 Libaas (1988)
 Atma (2006)
 Dombivali Fast  (2005)
 Umar (2006)
 Khujli
 Red Swastik (2007)
 Miss Anara (2007)
 Jimmy (2008)
 Bali Che Rajya Yeu De(Marathi) (2008)
 Evano Oruvan (Tamil) (2007)
 Mi Nahi Ho Tyatla (Marathi) (2008)
 Good Luck (2000)
 Abhimanyu 
 Mumbai Meri Jaan (2008)
 Bandya aani Bebby (2010)
 Dhuaan (2013)
 Ajoba Vayat Aale (Marathi) (2011)
 Ringa Ringa (Marathi) (2010)
 Riwayat (2012)
 Debu (film) (Marathi) (2010)
 Kab se Sambhala Hai Dil (2005)
 Ajab Lagnachi Gajzb Gosht (Marathi) (2010)
 Chaloo (2011)
 Force (2011)
 Bikkar Bai Sentimental (Punjabi) (2013)
 Love Recipe (2012)
 Lai Bhaari (2014)
 Rocky the Slave (2011)
 Ka Kha Ga 
 Bhay (Marathi) (2016)
 Drishyam (2015)
 Madaari (2016)
 Aapla Manus (2018)
 Criminal Justice (2019) Indian Adaptation
 Out of Love (2019)
 Samaantar Web Seris (2020)
 Duri Me Bhi Hum Pass Hai (2020) Music Composer
 Times Music (2020) Episode 1
 Criminal Justice: Behind Closed Doors (2021)
 Out of Love Season 2(2021)
 Sutliyan (Web series) (2022)
 Criminal Justice (2022) Season 3

References

External links
 https://www.imdb.com/name/nm2192772/
 http://myswar.com/artist/sameer-phatarpekar
 https://www.imdb.com/name/nm2192772/
 https://www.imdb.com/title/tt4430212/reviews-2
 http://www.zeetalkies.com/gossip/background-music-is-like-a-character-of-the-film-sameer-phatarpekar.html
 https://www.youtube.com/channel/UC8dkp-DhFo5C9b5e1xfnNwQ

Indian film score composers
Musicians from Mumbai
Indian male film score composers